The Mentawi flying squirrel (Iomys sipora) is a species of rodent in the family Sciuridae. It is endemic to Indonesia where it is only known from the Mentawai Islands (Sipura and North Pagai). It is threatened by habitat loss.

Sources

Iomys
Endemic fauna of Indonesia
Rodents of Indonesia
Fauna of Sumatra
Mentawai Islands Regency
Endangered animals
Endangered biota of Asia
Mammals described in 1828
Taxa named by Frederick Nutter Chasen
Taxonomy articles created by Polbot